Majji Sundarayya Patrudu (died 16 February 2004, Visakhapatnam) was an Indian communist politician and trade unionist from Andhra Pradesh. At the time of his death he was the general secretary of the All India Centre of Trade Unions and a Central Committee member of the Marxist Communist Party of India.

M.S. Patrudu contested the 1999 Andhra Pradesh Legislative Assembly election from the Visakhapatnam-I constituency. He got 676 votes (0.9% of the votes in the constituency).

References

Communist Party of India politicians from Andhra Pradesh
Trade unionists from Andhra Pradesh
2004 deaths
Year of birth missing
Communist Party of India (Marxist) politicians from Andhra Pradesh
Politicians from Visakhapatnam
20th-century Indian politicians